The Lakas-Laban Coalition was the multi-party electoral alliance supported by the administration of President Fidel V. Ramos for the May 8, 1995 Philippine midterm legislative and local elections. It was a coalition of two major parties in the Philippines, the Lakas-National Union of Christian Democrats—United Muslim Democrats of the Philippines (Lakas—NUCD—UMDP) of President Ramos, and the Laban ng Demokratikong Pilipino (LDP) of Senator Edgardo J. Angara.

Senatorial Slate

Results
9 out of 12 candidates won the possible 12 seats in the Senate namely: (in order of votes received)
 Gloria Macapagal Arroyo
 Franklin Drilon
 Juan Ponce Enrile
 Marcelo Fernan
 Juan Flavier
 Ramon Magsaysay Jr.
 Serge Osmeña
 Raul Roco
 Francisco Tatad

See also
Nationalist People's Coalition, Lakas-Laban Coalition's rival coalition in the 1995 midterm elections.

Defunct political party alliances in the Philippines